David Mena may refer to:

 David Mena (politician) (born 1953), Israeli politician and lawyer
 David Mena (footballer) (born 1992), Colombian footballer